Journal of Hydrology is a peer-reviewed academic journal published by Elsevier about hydrological sciences including water based management and related policy issues.

External links
 

 Hydrology journals
 Elsevier academic journals